Nidecker (aka Nidecker Group) is a family-owned Swiss snowboarding company based in Rolle, Switzerland. Nidecker was founded in Etoy, Switzerland, in 1887. They own and operate several snowboard product companies and brands including Flow, Jones, Nidecker, NOW and YES. It is considered the second biggest snowboard company in the world. The company was passed down 5 generations. The Nidecker Group was formed in 2008 by three descendants of Henri: Cédric, Henry and Xavier Nidecker. Henry Nidecker is the CEO of the company.

In 2017 Nidecker bought American binding specialist Flow. In 2018, they bought the brand Rome.

History 

Nidecker was started by Swiss entrepreneur Henri Nidecker in 1887. The company began as an agricultural equipment maker for Swiss farmers on the shores of Lake Geneva. Henri I was trained as carpenter and became a specialist in the "art of bending wood"  after purchasing the first electric motor in the region built for this purpose. 

It wasn't until 1912 however, that Nidecker began producing skis after Henri I's son, Henri II built produced their first pairs from ash. By the 1940s Nidecker was well established in the production of skis and in 1946 Henri III created the world's first composite wood skis combing ash and hickory. 

Nidecker continued producing skis and in 1962 became one of the first companies to manufacture skis built with metal and fiberglass.  In 1977, under the leadership of Henri IV, Nidecker won a gold medal at the 6th International Ski Show in Geneva for their new ski skin system called the Varai-Clix. 

In 1984, Nidecker joined the snowboard market releasing their first series of 50 snowboards. They then increased their manufacturing output to 700 snowboards in 1985.
In 2008 the Nidecker Group was formed by Cédric, Henry, and Xavier Nidecker, the three sons of Henri IV. Henry Nidecker became CEO of the company. In 2009, in collaboration with Romain de Marchi, JP Solberg, and David Carrier Porcheron (DCP), Nidecker launched YES. The following year, in 2010, Nidecker partnered with professional snowboarder Jeremy Jones to launch Jones Snowboards. In the same year YES. won EuroSIMA's Breakthrough Brand Award. 

In 2012 Nidecker launched NOW bindings in partnership with former professional snowboarder JF Pelchat. Following on from their previous success in 2017 Nidecker acquired the binding and boot manufacturer Flow. 

In 2018, the Nidecker Group acquired the Dutch based company Low Pressure Studio, owners of Bataleon, Lobster, and Switchback, at the same time adding Rome SDS joined Low Pressure Studio.

References

External links
 Nidecker Group - Official Website

Snowboarding companies
Sports equipment makers
Swiss companies established in 1887
Family-owned companies